Keava is a small borough in Kehtna Parish, Rapla County, Estonia. Population 287 (as of 1 January 2007).  It has a railway station on the Tallinn–Viljandi railway line operated by Elron (rail transit).

Keava hill fort
The remains of a hill fort, probably used as early as the second millennium BC, lie on a steep ridge in Keava. It was in use until the Middle Ages and may be identical to a castle raided, according to Russian chronicles, by Iziaslav I of Kiev in 1054.

References

Boroughs and small boroughs in Estonia
Kehtna Parish
Kreis Harrien